Tansyzarovo (Tañhıźar) is a rural locality (a village) in Tangatarovsky Selsoviet, Burayevsky District, Bashkortostan, Russia. The population was 55 as of 2010. There is one street.

Geography 
Tansyzarovo is located 35 km southwest of Burayevo (the district's administrative centre) by road. Khaziyevo is the nearest rural locality.

References 

Rural localities in Burayevsky District